Björg Carítas Þorláksson (also cited as Bjorg Caritas Thorlaksson;  30 January 1874 – 25 February 1934) was an Icelandic scholar and teacher. After earning her teaching certificate in Ytriey she taught for three years and studied in Denmark, before applying to the Reykjavík Junior College to further her education. Refused admittance, she moved back to Copenhagen and earned a Danish teaching degree. She studied at the Athens Classes to learn Greek and Latin and was admitted to graduate study at the University of Copenhagen. After her marriage, she abandoned her studies to work on the preparation of an Icelandic-Danish Dictionary, for the next two decades with her husband. When the dictionary was completed, his work was recognized and hers was not. Divorcing, she moved to Paris and attained a PhD, the first woman in Iceland to attain the distinction. Suffering from ill-health, she published until her death from breast cancer.

Early life
Their father was farmer and the mayor of Vesturhópshólar and her maternal grandfather Jón Eiríksson was the priest of Undirfell (is).

Career
As soon as she graduated, Björg began working as a teacher and taught for the next three years. In 1897, she went to Copenhagen with her brother Jón to further her education. She enrolled in the school taught by Natalie Zahle but left after a year and applied to study at the Lærða skólanum (The Learned School) at the Reykjavík Junior College. Her application was not approved and she remained in Copenhagen to finish her teaching degree. In 1900, she completed her degree from the Lyceum in Copenhagen and then attended courses at the Athens Classes to study Greek and Latin. She again applied to attend Reykjavik Junior College as a sixth year student, but was rejected because school policy allowed women to take a matriculation examination, but not attend classes. Instead, Björg enrolled at Nørrebro's Latin and Real School (da) in Copenhagen, graduating with her bachelor's degree in 1901. The following year, she passed the PhD candidacy examination for the University of Copenhagen and enrolled in classes.

In 1903, Björg married Sigfús Blöndal, a bookkeeper at the Royal Danish Library. Björg took his name and became known as Björg Blöndal. Together, they embarked on a project to create an Icelandic-Danish dictionary. The work took them nearly twenty years to complete, in part due to several bouts of illness.  Blöndal was diagnosed with tuberculosis in 1907 and spent most of 1908 in a tubercular hospital. She did not fully recover her health until 1911. In 1919, she was hospitalized at the state hospital in Copenhagen for lung cancer, but the tumor was found to be benign. When Konunglega bókasafnið, was published in 1922, only her husband's work was recognized. Upon completion of the work, the couple's marriage fell apart and they filed for divorce. Sigfús was granted an honorary doctorate from the University of Iceland in 1924, but Björg was not. She took the name Björg C. Þorláksson (Björg C. Thorláksson) and moved to Paris. Her divorced was finally granted in 1925, by which time, Þorláksson was studying at the Sorbonne.

Þorláksson prepared her thesis, Le fondement physiologique des instincts des systèmes nutritif, neuromuscular et genital (The physiological basis of the instincts of the nutritive, neuromuscular and genital systems), which evaluated whether instinct was prompted by biology. She graduated in 1926 as the first Icelandic woman to achieve a doctorate degree. In 1928 the tumors returned and she underwent radiation therapy in Paris. She was put in an asylum, against her will, as it was believed she was suffering from delusions.

Death and legacy
Þorláksson died of breast cancer on 25 February 1934 in Copenhagen. In 2000, sculptor Ásmundur Sveinsson created a bust of Þorláksson to be installed in her honor at the University of Iceland. In 2001, Sigríður Dúna Kristmundsdóttir (is) published a biography of Þorláksson, Björg: Ævisaga Bjargar C. Þorláksson (Björg: Life story of Björg C. Þorláksson) with JPV Publishing.

Selected works
In addition to her own writing, Þorláksson published work as a translator. Works she authored include:
 Kvindevalgrettens Sejr paa Island o. fl. í Kvinden og Samfundet (Women's Victory in Iceland, etc. in Women and Society), Copenhagen 1915
 Kvinden og Samfundet orðabók (Danish-Icelandic Dictionary, co-authored with Sigfús Blöndal, 1920–1924)
 Erindi um menntamál kvenna (Women's Education), Reykjavík 1925
 Le fondement physiologique des instincts des systèmes nutritif, neuromuscular et genital (The physiological basis of the instincts of the nutritive, neuromuscular and genital systems), Paris 1926
 Svefn og draumar (Sleeping and Dreaming), Reykjavík 1926–1928
 Leikur lífsins (Game of Life), Reykjavík 1927
 Mataræði og þjóðþrif (Diet and Nationality), Reykjavík 1930
 Daglegar máltíðir (Daily Meals), Reykjavík 1933
 Ljóðmæli (Poetry), Reykjavík 1934.

References

Citations

Bibliography

 
 
 
 
 
 
 
 

1874 births
1934 deaths
19th-century Icelandic writers
19th-century Icelandic women writers
20th-century Icelandic writers
20th-century Icelandic women writers
University of Paris alumni